Garre's sclerosing osteomyelitis is a type of chronic osteomyelitis also called periostitis ossificans and Garré's sclerosing osteomyelitis.

It is a rare disease. It mainly affects children and young adults. It is associated with a low grade infection, which may be due to dental caries (cavities in the teeth).

The body of the mandible may show irregular lucent/opaque changes with subperiosteal opaque layering along inferior border. It is a chronic osteomyelitis with subperiosteal bone and collagen deposition.
There is no suppuration and sinus formation.
It was first described by the Swiss surgeon Carl Garré.

References

Bacterial diseases
Skeletal disorders
Osteopathies
Rare diseases
Jaw disorders
Rare infectious diseases